Bozieni is a commune in Hînceşti District, Moldova. It is composed of two villages, Bozieni and Dubovca.

References

Communes of Hîncești District